Vision Swim is a noise album by Growing released in 2007.  It was released by Troubleman Records.

Track listing 
"Limbo" (2:38)
"On Anon" (15:20)
"Morning Drive" (11:13)
"Emseepee" (4:25)
"Lightfoot" (6:28)

References

2007 albums
Growing (band) albums